José Segura Rius (born January 23, 1961, in Olesa de Montserrat) is a Spanish professional football coach.

Segura won both the Greek championship and Cup with Olympiacos FC after the sacking of Takis Lemonis in March 2008. He decided to leave the club after the end of the season, despite winning two titles, because the board was planning to agree with a more experienced coach. Also the 4–0 defeat from AEK Athens for the championship was a black page for him in Olympiacos. Before joining Olympiacos FC he was assistant coach to Llorenç Serra Ferrer at AEK Athens FC. In May 2009 Segura agreed to join Liverpool Football Club as a Technical Manager at the club's Academy.

On 12 March 2011, Liverpool FC announced they had parted company with reserve team boss John McMahon with academy technical director Jose 'Pep' Segura taking over for the rest of the season.

On 25 September 2012, Liverpool FC confirmed that Segura had left the club.

Timeline
2001–2002: Teacher at Lleida of Physical education.
2002–2003: Assistant of Llorenç Serra Ferrer in Barcelona youth system.
2003–2004: Assistant in FC Barcelona B, second team of Barcelona.
2004–2006: Teacher again in Lleida university.
2006–2007 Assistant coach of Ferrer at AEK Athens FC.
2007–2008 Assistant coach of Takis Lemonis at Olympiakos FC.
2008–2009 Manager at Olympiacos FC.
2009–2012 Academy Technical Manager at Liverpool.
2015–2017 Head of academy at FC Barcelona B, second team of Barcelona
2017–2019 General Manager of FC Barcelona Footballing

References

1961 births
Living people
Spanish football managers
Liverpool F.C. non-playing staff
Olympiacos F.C. managers
FC Barcelona non-playing staff
AEK Athens F.C. non-playing staff
Olympiacos F.C. non-playing staff
Association football coaches